The EF is an automotive engine made by Subaru, introduced in 1984 for the Subaru Justy.
It is a water-cooled, straight-three, four-stroke engine with a belt-driven single overhead camshaft, and a chain-driven balance shaft. The two-cylinder EK23 engine is closely related to the EF series, sharing the same bore spacing and overall design. The export market 665 cc EK42 motor even shares the bore and stroke of the EF10.

It is the first Subaru engine to incorporate the displacement in its name, and the only iron block Subaru ever.

EF10
1.0-litre (997 cc) two valves per cylinder

Bore x Stroke:  x 

Power:
  at 5000 rpm/ at 3200 rpm with single barrel Hitachi carburetor and 9.5:1 compression ratio
  at 6000 rpm/ at 3600 rpm with dual barrel Hitachi carburetor and 9.5:1 compression ratio
Usage:
Subaru Justy "J10" (limited to some European markets and Asia)
Subaru Libero "E10"

EF12
1.2-litre (1189 cc) three valves per cylinder

Bore x Stroke:  x 

Power:
  at 5200 rpm/ at 3600 rpm with two barrel Hitachi carburetor and 9:1 compression ratio
  at 5600 rpm/ at 3600 rpm with multi-port fuel injection and 9.1:1 compression ratio

Usage:
Subaru Justy "J12"
Subaru Libero "E12"

Power:
  with multi-point fuel injection

Usage:
Subaru Tutto (Taiwan)

External links
 Subaru
 Dusty's Justys

References

Subaru engines
Straight-three engines